Thomas Lloyd Vermeule (11 June 1814, New Jersey – 1856, Stockton, California) served in the California senate and signed the Constitution of California.  During the Mexican–American War, he served in the United States Army.

References

1814 births
1856 deaths
American military personnel of the Mexican–American War
Members of the California State Legislature
19th-century American politicians